The Lampyrinae are a large subfamily of fireflies (Lampyridae). The exact delimitation, and the internal systematics, have until recently been a matter of debate; for long this group was used as a "wastebin taxon" to hold any fireflies with insufficiently resolved relationships. Regardless, they are very diverse even as a good monophyletic group, containing flashing and continuous-glow fireflies from the Holarctic and some tropical forms as well. The ancestral Lampyrinae probably had no or very primitive light signals; in any case several modern lineages appear to have returned to the pheromone communication of their ancestors independently.

Systematics
The group has recently been examined using molecular phylogenetics, using fairly comprehensive sampling.

References

Lampyridae
Taxa named by Pierre André Latreille